Manhattan Tower was a Patti Page LP album, issued by Mercury Records as catalog number MG-20226 in 1956. It is her version of Gordon Jenkins' popular 1948/1956 Manhattan Tower suite.

Billboard liked the album commenting, inter alia, "Gordon Jenkins' new, expanded "Manhattan Tower" score soon to be showcased, via a TV spectacular is handed a class A vocal treatment by Patti Page, who sings 11 tunes...from the score with her usual good taste, technical know-how and warm sincerity..."

The album was reissued, combined with the 1956 Patti Page album You Go to My Head, in compact disc format, by Sepia Records on September 4, 2007.

Track listing

References

Mercury Records albums
1956 albums
Patti Page albums